Hugo Manuel Gomes dos Santos e Santos, known as Hugo (born 23 December 1972) is a former Portuguese football player.

He played 10 seasons and 195 games in the Primeira Liga for União de Leiria, Farense and Beira-Mar.

Club career
He made his Primeira Liga debut on 22 March 1992 for Farense as a late substitute in a 3–0 victory over Vitória de Guimarães.

References

1972 births
People from Mértola
Living people
Portuguese footballers
S.C. Farense players
Primeira Liga players
U.D. Leiria players
Liga Portugal 2 players
S.C. Beira-Mar players
S.C. Salgueiros players
Louletano D.C. players
Association football midfielders
Sportspeople from Beja District